Election will be held in Caraga for seats in the House of Representatives of the Philippines on May 9, 2016.

Summary

Agusan del Norte
Each of Agusan del Norte's two legislative districts will elect each representative to the House of Representatives. The candidate with the highest number of votes wins the seat.

1st District
Lawrence Lemuel H. Fortun is the incumbent

2nd District
Erlpe John M. Amante is the incumbent.

Agusan del Sur
Each of Agusan del Sur's two legislative districts will elect each representative to the House of Representatives. The candidate with the highest number of votes wins the seat.

1st District
Ma. Valentina Plaza-Cornelio is the incumbent and running unopposed.

2nd District
Evelyn G. Plaza-Mellana is the incumbent and also running unopposed.

Dinagat Islands
Arlene J. Bag-ao is the incumbent.

Surigao del Norte
Each of Surigao del Norte's two legislative districts will elect each representative to the House of Representatives. The candidate with the highest number of votes wins the seat.

1st District
Francisco T. Matugas is the incumbent but ineligible for reelection. His party nominated his eldest son, Francisco Jose Matugas. Constantino Navarro III, son of former Surigao City mayor Constantino Navarro Jr. challenged him the seat.

2nd District
Guillermo A. Romarate Jr. is the incumbent but ineligible for reelection. He is running for governor instead. Former congressman Robert Ace Barbers is running against climate change lawyer Mary Ann Lucille L. Sering.

Surigao del Sur
Each of Surigao del Sur's two legislative districts will elect each representative to the House of Representatives. The candidate with the highest number of votes wins the seat

1st District
Neophyte congresswoman Mary Elizabeth Ty-Delgado is the incumbent but not seeking for reelection. Former congressman, Prospero Pichay Jr. is running to regain his seat.

2nd District
Florencio C. Garay is the incumbent but ineligible for reelection. He is running for governor instead. Incumbent governor Johnny T. Pimentel was challenged by incumbent provincial board member, Conrad C. Cejoco.

References

External links
COMELEC - Official website of the Philippine Commission on Elections (COMELEC)
NAMFREL - Official website of National Movement for Free Elections (NAMFREL)
PPCRV - Official website of the Parish Pastoral Council for Responsible Voting (PPCRV)

2016 Philippine general election
Lower house elections in Caraga